SM UC-12 was a German Type UC I minelayer submarine or U-boat in the German Imperial Navy during World War I.

Design
A German Type UC I submarine, UC-1 had a displacement of  when at the surface and  while submerged. The submarine was powered by one Benz six-cylinder, four-stroke diesel engine producing , an electric motor producing , and one propeller shaft.

UC-1 was fitted with six  mine tubes, twelve UC 120 mines, and one  machine gun. She was built by AG Weser Bremen and her complement was fourteen crew members.

Construction
The U-boat was ordered on 23 November 1914, laid down on 27 January 1915, and was launched on 29 April 1915. She was commissioned into the German Imperial Navy on 2 May 1915 as SM UC-12.

Service history
UC-12 served with the Pola Flotilla based at Cattaro in the Adriatic. She operated as a minelayer, and undertook seven patrols in this role. Mines laid by UC-12 were credited with sinking six ships. One of these, the Italian Marechiaro sunk on 21 February 1916, was listed as a hospital ship and sank with over 200 casualties.
Since Germany was not at war with Italy at this stage, though Austria was, UC 12, like other German U-boats in the Mediterranean, operated under the Austro-Hungarian flag.

Fate
On 16 March 1916 UC-12 was sunk by the detonation of one of her own mines while laying a mine fields off Taranto harbour. Italian divers inspected the wreck and established its identity. The knowledge that Germany, technically their ally, was assiduously mining their naval bases was a contributing factor in Italy’s decision in August 1916 to declare war on Germany.
The submarine was raised by Italy and commissioned as X-1 in the Italian Royal Navy.

Summary of raiding history

References

Notes

Citations

Bibliography

 
Paul Kemp ( 1997): U-Boats Destroyed .

External links
 X 1 Marina Militare website 

German Type UC I submarines
Ships built in Bremen (state)
1915 ships
U-boats commissioned in 1915
World War I submarines of Germany
Maritime incidents in 1916
U-boats sunk in 1916
U-boats sunk by mines
Captured ships
Submarines of the Regia Marina
World War I submarines of Italy
World War I minelayers of Germany
Ships lost with all hands